When Was the Last Time is the sixth studio album and fifth in the country genre by American country music singer Darius Rucker. It was released on Capitol Records Nashville on October 20, 2017.

Content
"If I Told You" was released as the album's lead single on July 5, 2016. It reached No. 1 on the Billboard Country Airplay chart dated June 24, 2017, becoming his first No. 1 since "Wagon Wheel" in 2013. The album's second single, "For the First Time", was released on July 24, 2017. It reached number one on the  Billboard Country Airplay chart dated June 2, 2018.

"Straight to Hell", which features guest vocals from Jason Aldean, Luke Bryan, and Charles Kelley, was previously recorded by Drivin' N' Cryin' on their 1989 album Mystery Road. This song was released as the album's third single on June 25, 2018.

Critical reception
Stephen Thomas Erlewine of AllMusic rated the album 3 out of 5 stars, saying that "not much separates" it from Rucker's previous country albums, but noting the vocal performances on "Story to Tell" and "Another Night with You" while calling "Straight to Hell" the "rowdiest country he's ever done".

Commercial performance
On its debut week, the album charted at No. 8 on the US Billboard 200, which is Rucker's fifth top 10 album on the chart. It also debuted at No. 2 on the Top Country Albums chart, with 30,000 copies sold in the first week, 34,000 units, including track sales and streams. In its second week, it sold a further 9,300 copies. It has sold 123,400 copies in the United States as of April 2019.

Track listing

Personnel
Adapted from AllMusic

Jason Aldean – vocals on "Straight to Hell"
Luke Bryan – vocals on "Straight to Hell"
Rodney Clawson – acoustic guitar, background vocals
Perry Coleman – background vocals
Ross Copperman – acoustic guitar, electric guitar, keyboards, background vocals
Zach Crowell – programming 
David Davidson – violin
Dan Dugmore – acoustic guitar, electric guitar, lap steel guitar, mandolin, pedal steel guitar
Stuart Duncan – fiddle
Conni Ellisor – violin
Fred Eltringham – drums
Derek George – acoustic guitar, programming, background vocals
Carolyn Dawn Johnson – background vocals
Jaren Johnston – background vocals
Charles Kelley – vocals on "Straight to Hell"
Elizabeth Lamb – viola
Andy Leftwich – fiddle
Jason Lehning – keyboards
Tony Lucido – bass guitar
Rob McNelley – acoustic guitar, electric guitar
Josh Osborne – background vocals
Carole Rabinowitz – cello
Darius Rucker – lead vocals
Chris Tompkins – electric guitar, programming
Alan Umstead – violin
Mary Katherine Vanosdale – violin
Derek Wells – banjo, acoustic guitar, electric guitar
Bergen White – string arrangements, conductor
Micah Wilshire – background vocals

Chart performance

Weekly charts

Year-end charts

References

2017 albums
Capitol Records albums
Darius Rucker albums
Albums produced by Ross Copperman